Antonio Milić (born 10 March 1994) is a Croatian professional footballer who plays as a defender for Polish club Lech Poznań.

Club career

Hajduk Split
A product of Hajduk Split academy, Krasimir Balakov handed Milić his first team minutes in the Croatian Cup match against Jadran Gunja but his first league appearance came off the bench on 26 November 2011, in a 2–1 win over Šibenik, aged just 17 years, 8 months and 16 days. He made only one other league appearances that season, also off the bench, but he made another two Cup appearances against Zagreb also. After manager Balakov left Hajduk, new manager Mišo Krstičević came to the Hajduk bench. Since Krstičević managed the Hajduk U-19 team before he knew how to use Milić for the next season. In June 2012 Antonio won the Croatian U-19 championship.

In the 2012–13 Prva HNL, he started as a first team regular. The team's manager, Mišo Krstičević, made Milić a much more stable member of the first team, often playing in the holding midfield role, but also playing as either a central defender or a central midfielder. He played a significant role in defeating Inter Milan 2–0 on San Siro in the 2012–13 UEFA Europa League. He showed great talent while playing in the Prva HNL, and many people consider him on becoming the leading Croatian defender. Antonio Milić and Josip Radošević together created the best double pivot couple in Prva HNL. During Hajduk's winter preparations, he suffered an injury, which kept him off the pitch for nearly two months but he returned and helped his team to reach the 2012–13 Croatian Cup final by scoring the equalizer goal in the away match against Slaven Belupo on Poljud. In May 2013 Antonio signed a new contract with Hajduk that would keep him with the club until 2015. In May 2013 he won the Croatian Cup.

Under new manager Igor Tudor, Antonio's role in the team changed and was somewhat reduced. He was deployed either at left back or at center back and made 22 appearances in all competitions.

Oostende
On 20 December 2014, it was announced that Milić will join the Belgian club K.V. Oostende for a fee of 500 thousand euros.

Anderlecht
After a great three-year display at Oostende, Milić was about to join Anderlecht at the end of January 2018, but failed to sign with them as the transfer could not be completed due to the end of the transfer window. On 22 May 2018, it was announced that Milić has signed a three-year contract with Anderlecht, along with his teammate Knowledge Musona.

Rayo Vallecano (loan)
On 30 August 2019, Milić joined Spanish Segunda División side Rayo Vallecano on a one-year loan deal.

Lech Poznań 
On 10 January 2021, Milić was transferred from Anderlecht to Polish side Lech Poznań.

International career
He was called up to the senior Croatia squad for the first time for a World Cup qualifier against Ukraine in October 2017.

In August 2018 he was called up as a part of Croatia's UEFA Nations League squad for matches against Spain and England. On 6 September 2018, Milić earned his first cap for Croatia in an international friendly against Portugal.

Career statistics

International

Honours
Hajduk Split
Croatian U-19 championship: 2012
Croatian Cup: 2012–13

Lech Poznań
 Ekstraklasa: 2021–22

References

External links
 
 
 

1994 births
Living people
Footballers from Split, Croatia
Association football defenders
Association football midfielders
Croatian footballers
Croatia youth international footballers
Croatia under-21 international footballers
Croatia international footballers
HNK Hajduk Split players
K.V. Oostende players
R.S.C. Anderlecht players
Rayo Vallecano players
Lech Poznań players
Croatian Football League players
Belgian Pro League players
Segunda División players
Ekstraklasa players
Croatian expatriate footballers
Expatriate footballers in Belgium
Croatian expatriate sportspeople in Belgium
Expatriate footballers in Spain
Croatian expatriate sportspeople in Spain
Expatriate footballers in Poland
Croatian expatriate sportspeople in Poland